James Cranke (June 23, 1707 – October 28, 1780) was an English painter.

Biography
Born at Little Urswick, near Barrow-in-Furness, he lived there for most of his life. He was trained as a plasterer, but became a self-taught portrait painter and attempted to make his name in London c. 1737–52. He attended St. Martin's Lane Academy and in 1744 he married a well-known heiress and opened his own studio in Bloomsbury Square. Several art historians have recognised that he may have been more prolific had ill health not forced him to return home. His chosen medium was oil on canvas.

James Cranke taught the well-known artist George Romney (1734–1802) how to paint when he was a small boy. Romney was born at Beckside, Dalton-in-Furness, which was close to the home of the Cranke Family. James Cranke taught one of his sons, James Cranke Jr (1746–1826), to follow him as a portrait painter.

The success of James Cranke and his son as portrait painters helped their family to become important local landowners. Steelworks
In 1854 the Furness Railway persuaded their descendants to sell their rural estate at Hindpool, and this enabled the development of Barrow as a town to begin in earnest.

James Cranke is also notable as the father of the mathematician John Cranke. An altar painting of the Last Supper by Cranke can be seen at St Mary and St Michael's Church, Great Urswick.

References
Redgrave's Century of English Painters.

External links
Art of James Cranke
James Cranke on Arnet

1707 births
1780 deaths
18th-century English painters
English male painters
People from Barrow-in-Furness
18th-century English male artists